Dzán Municipality (In the Yucatec Maya Language: “plunge or sunken") is one of the 106 municipalities in the Mexican state of Yucatán containing (61.31 km2) of land and is located roughly 95 km south of the city of Mérida.

History
There is no accurate data on when the town was founded, though it existed before the conquest. At colonization, Dzán became part of the encomienda system. The area encompassing Dzán and Muna Municipality were joined at the time of encomienda. The first encomendero was Castilla in 1549 and it then passed to Alonso Rosado and Diego Rosado. By 1607 the encomendero was Pedro Rosado.

Yucatán declared its independence from the Spanish Crown in 1821, and in 1825 the area was assigned to the high sierra partition of Ticul Municipality. In 1932 it was designated as its own municipality.

Governance
The municipal president is elected for a three-year term. The town council has five councilpersons, who serve as Secretary and councilors of public works, public security, cemeteries and nomenclature.

Communities
The head of the municipality is Dzán, Yucatán.  There are 4 populated areas of the municipality. The significant populations are shown below:

Local festivals
Every year from 6 to 14 September is the Festival of Cristo de San Román.

Tourist attractions
 Church of Santiago Apóstol, built in the seventeenth century
 Chapel of the Holy Cross
 Archaeological sites in the area around Dzán

References

Municipalities of Yucatán